Dave Derby is an American songwriter, recording artist, producer, and composer who was born in Honolulu, Hawaii and now resides in New York City.

Derby serves as a songwriter and producer for Gramercy Arms, a New York City musical and artist collective featuring members of Luna, Elk City, The Dambuilders, Guided by Voices, Shudder to Think, Joan As Police Woman, Mascott, Sparklehorse and A Girl Called Eddy, as well as notable artists such as Lloyd Cole, Tanya Donelly, Matthew Caws, Doug Gillard, Diesel and Kay Hanley. Derby has also produced albums for Reveal Records.

Gramercy Arms released their second album "The Seasons of Love" in August 2014 on Reveal Records. The album received a positive review in The Wall Street Journal. A video was released on YouTube for the album's song "Beautiful Disguise" which featured Lloyd Cole and Joan Wasser on lead vocals. Their third album tentatively titled "Deleted Scene" and an EP called "The Making of the Making of" will be released on Reveal Records and Magic Door Records in late 2021.

In addition to his work with Gramercy Arms, Dave was a founding member of The Dambuilders, Brilliantine, The Norfolk Downs, and has released solo records, and played bass in Lloyd Cole's band The Negatives. Derby and Cole have co-written numerous songs and shared production credits for both of their respective musical projects. Derby has also composed and produced music for film and TV including a song that he co-wrote with Michael Kotch and Colleen Fitzpatrick (Vitamin C) for Hannah Montana in Hannah Montana: The Movie .

Derby wrote and performed the theme song for Pilot Season. While the show was not picked up by any television networks, the song eventually became the end theme for The Majority Report with Sam Seder.

References

American male songwriters
American male composers
21st-century American composers
Year of birth missing (living people)
Living people
Musicians from Honolulu
The Dambuilders members
21st-century American male musicians